James Winford Dobson (April 2, 1939 – February 26, 2018) was a baseball player who played third base. He won the 1959 College World Series Most Outstanding Player award while a sophomore at Oklahoma State University.

He spent two years playing baseball professionally, never reaching the majors. He hit 14 home runs with 65 RBI in the minors. He died on February 26, 2018.

References

1939 births
2018 deaths
College World Series Most Outstanding Player Award winners
Oklahoma State Cowboys baseball players
Jacksonville Jets players
Modesto Colts players
Durham Bulls players